The 12 January 1879 action at Sihayo's Kraal was an early skirmish in the Anglo-Zulu War.  The day after launching an invasion of Zululand, the British Lieutenant-General Lord Chelmsford led a reconnaissance in force against the kraal of Zulu Chief Sihayo kaXongo.  This was intended to secure his left flank for an advance on the Zulu capital at Ulundi and as retribution against Sihayo for the incursion of his sons into the neighbouring British Colony of Natal.

En-route to the kraal the British force found a small party of Zulus in a horseshoe-shaped gorge.  A frontal assault was launched by auxiliary troops from the Natal Native Contingent (NNC), supported by British regulars, while a mixed unit of mounted infantry moved onto the high ground to the rear of the Zulus.  After the NNC attack faltered the regulars reinvigorated the attack and defeated the Zulus in the gorge.  The mounted force engaged around sixty Zulus on the high ground and drove them off.  The Zulu force suffered losses of 40 killed, 4 wounded and at least 3 captured.  The British lost 2 members of the NNC killed and 22 wounded.

After their victory the British moved on Sihayo's Kraal, which they found to be undefended.  After burning it down they returned to their camp.  The action is believed to have led Cetshwayo to attack Chelmsford's force in preference to the two other British columns operating in Zululand. Much of Chelmford's column was destroyed at the Battle of Isandlwana ten days later.

Background 
In the 1870s the British government sought to extend its control over Southern Africa.  Apart from the valuable naval base at the Cape of Good Hope they had previously shown little interest in the region but this changed with the discovery of valuable mineral deposits.  In 1877 Sir Henry Bartle Frere was dispatched as High Commissioner for Southern Africa with a mandate to bring the existing colonies, indigenous African groups and the Boer republics under British authority.  Frere viewed the independent Zulu Kingdom as a possible threat to this plan and sought an excuse to declare war and annex it.  He established a boundary commission to look into a dispute between Zululand and the Boer Transvaal, which had been recently annexed by the British, hoping for an outcome that would enrage the Zulu king, Cetshwayo.  However, when the report was produced it largely backed the Zulu claim.

Frere instead seized on an incident in July 1878.  Two wives of Zulu chief Sihayo kaXongo fled from his kraal  (homestead) into the British colony of Natal.  Two of Sihayo's sons crossed into Natal with an armed band, seized the women and returned them to Zululand where they were executed.  Frere mobilised British troops on the border and requested a meeting with Cetshwayo's representatives in December, ostensibly to discuss the report of the boundary commission.  Frere instead presented them with an ultimatum.  Cetshwayo was required to turn over Sihayo's sons to face British justice and turn over the chief Mbilini waMswati to the Transvaal courts for raiding as well as paying a fine of cattle for these offenses and the 1878 Natal–Zululand border incident.  Frere also demanded wholesale changes to the Zulu system of government including limits on the use of the death penalty, the requirement for judicial trials, supervision by a British official, admission of Christian missionaries and the abolition of the Zulu social/army system and the associated restrictions on marriage.  The ultimatum was harsh, demanding radical change in the Zulu way of life, and it was intended by Frere that Cetshwayo would reject it.  Emissaries sent by Cetshwayo requesting an extension to the ultimatum deadline were ignored.

On 11 January 1879 the ultimatum expired and British forces, under Lieutenant-General Lord Chelmsford entered Zululand in three columns. One column operated close to the eastern coastline and one advanced from Transvaal in the west.  The main force, the Centre Column under Chelmsford, crossed the Buffalo River into Zulu territory at Rorke's Drift and made camp on the far side.  On 6 January Chelmsford had written to Frere that he had received reports that Sihayo had assembled 8,000 men to attack the British when they made their crossing, but it was unopposed.

He intended this to secure his left flank for the advance upon the Zulu capital of Ulundi and as a punitive measure against Sihayo. Chelmsford thought that an attack on Sihayo would show the British government that he was acting against the Zulu leadership, particularly those mentioned in the ultimatum, and not against the Zulu people in general. A reconnaissance party of the Natal Mounted Police under Major John Dartnell were dispatched on the first day of the invasion. Dartnell's force approached Sihayo's Kraal along the Bashee River valley and returned to Chelmsford's camp by that evening, he reported hearing war songs being sung by a large party of Zulu in the valley but could not locate them. Other scouting parties sent out in other directions captured a large number of Zulu cattle.

Advance 

Chelmsford ordered a force, commanded by Colonel Richard Thomas Glyn of the 24th Regiment of Foot, to leave the camp at 3:30 a.m. on 12 January; this was later described as a reconnaissance in force. Glyn's command was a mixed force of men from his regiment; auxiliary troops of the 3rd Regiment Natal Native Contingent (NNC), commanded by Major Wilsone Black; and some irregular mounted infantry, commanded by Lieutenant-Colonel John Cecil Russell. Chelmsford accompanied the force.  Glyn was in formal command but Chelmsford was prone to interfere in tactical matters and helped direct the movement of the column.  This practice led to uncertainty over the division of responsibility in the column, not helped by a personal rift between Glyn's chief of staff Major Francis Clery and Chelmsford's, Lieutenant-Colonel John North Crealock.

The British troops proceeded north-east from the camp keeping to a track on the west side of the Bashee River. After around  a quantity of cattle and other livestock were observed on the far side with a number of Zulus to the hills above them.  Chelmsford ordered the force to cross the river and prepare for action. Whilst Glyn and Chelmsford consulted on their battle plan, the Zulus taunted the British, shouting "Why are you waiting there? Are you looking to build kraals? Why don't you come on up?".

Action 
The Zulu defenders were commanded by Mkumbikazulu kaSihayo, one of Sihayo's sons involved in the Natal raid. They held a horseshoe-shaped gorge on a steep hillside, part of Ngedla Hill.  The open end of the gorge faced towards the Bashee River and the base of the cliffs were covered with boulders and scrub. Sihayo's kraal lay further to the north on a more gently sloping part of the Ngedla.

Chelmsford and Glyn determined to clear the Zulu from the gorge before proceeding to the kraal to burn it.  Chelmsford ordered Russell's mounted infantry to move to the south where the slope was climbable and to sweep around behind the Zulus on the heights to threaten them and cut off any retreat.  In the meantime the entire 1st battalion of the 3rd regiment of the Natal Native Contingent (under Commandant George Hamilton-Browne) were to assault the Zulus on the lower ground and attempt to seize the cattle, they would be supported by three companies of the 1st battalion of the 24th Regiment (commanded by Captain William Degacher).  The 2nd battalion of the 3rd regiment of the Natal Native Contingent (commanded by Commandant Edward Russell Cooper) and additional men from the 24th Regiment of Foot, including four companies of the 2nd battalion, were held in reserve.

The NNC, under Hamilton-Browne, led the attack, beginning probably a little after 8.00 am.  He had been ordered by Chelmsford not to open fire before the Zulu did and to avoid harming any Zulu women or children.  Hamilton-Browne was worried about the prospect of friendly fire from his poorly trained men and ordered them not to use their firearms at all.  The NNC had received little training in military drill and Hamilton-Browne's non-commissioned officers soon gave up attempts to keep the NNC in line during their advance.

As the British column approached the Zulu herdsmen drove the livestock deeper into the gorge and raised the alarm.  The NNC were in good spirits until they came within gunshot of the "several score" Zulu warriors who were hiding among boulders, shrubs and caves at the edges of the gorge. At this point they were challenged by a Zulu shouting "By whose orders do you come to the land of the Zulus?".  A newspaper reporter with the British, Charles Norris-Newman,  recorded that no reply was made but Hamilton-Browne claimed that his interpreter, Lieutenant R. Duncombe, replied "By the orders of the Great White Queen". The Zulus then opened fire on the British right flank, their first shot striking an NNC man and breaking his thigh bone. 

The NNC became pinned down but Hamilton-Browne led one company, to assault the Zulus in the rough ground.  The assault was successful in clearing the base of the gorge, and capturing a number of women and children, who were sent to the rear.  The Zulu warriors retreated up steep path leading to the top of the cliffs.

The path was barricaded and covered by concealed marksmen and, seeing the NNC falter, Black and a staff officer, Captain Henry Harford moved forward to support Hamilton-Browne.  On the way Harford spotted a Zulu taking aim at Glyn, who was observing from open ground, and shouted a warning, preventing his injury or death.  Black moved between parties of the NNC trying, largely in vain, to encourage them forwards.  Attempts by the NNC non-commissioned officers to force their men forwards by clubbing them with rifle butts also failed.  Harford rallied a group of NNC men and made some forward progress, clearing caves in the cliff face.  The men of the 24th also advanced, their rifles with fixed-bayonets proving an encouragement to the NNC.

The men of the NNC with rifles opened fire, causing the company under Hamilton-Browne at the foot of the cliffs, who were also under fire from the Zulus, to take cover.  Black once more tried to lead the NNC in an attack; waving his hat over his head in one hand and brandishing his sword in the other.  Black's hat was shot out of his hand and he was struck "below the belt" by a boulder thrown from the cliffs, causing pain but no injury and halting his advance.

Part of the 2nd Battalion of the NNC was also brought up in support but the action on the low ground was over by 9:00 a.m., as the NNC and men from the 24th Regiment climbed the cliffs elsewhere and outflanked the Zulus holding the path. At least a dozen Zulus were killed in action in the gorge along with two NNC men; around twenty NNC men and three of their European officers and non-commissioned officers were wounded.  

In the meantime Russell's mounted contingent had also reached the heights.  His force was split in two with the Natal Mounted Police and Natal Carbineers on the left and the other men on the right, out of sight on one another.  The left unit came under fire from a party of 60 Zulus in rocky ground.  They dismounted and advanced in skirmish order, returning fire.  The Zulus were driven off by 10.00 am, with losses of 10-18 dead and no British casualties.  The right-hand party captured a number of Zulu horses but otherwise had an uneventful day, except for narrowly avoiding a friendly fire incident with a party of the NNC who had removed their distinguishing red headbands to avoid attack by the Zulus.

Burning of the kraal 
After the action a force of four companies of the 2/24th and part of the 2nd Battalion of the 3rd NNC, under the overall command of Colonel Henry Degacher of the 24th Regiment was sent to Sihayo's kraal with orders to raze it. Degacher led a cautious advance in skirmish order. This was witnessed by men of the 1st battalion who, being on higher ground could see that the kraal was unoccupied and good humouredly mocked their comrades. Degacher's men then marched into the kraal and burnt it to the ground. Three old women and a young girl were found nearby but no male Zulu. The British soldiers recovered a number of Sihayo's carved prestige staffs from the kraal.

The entire force marched back to its camp by the Buffalo River, reaching it by 4:00 p.m.  The march was affected by a heavy thunderstorm and Chelmsford allowed the force a day off on 13 January to rest and dry their equipment.  The force was afterwards engaged in guard duties, reconnaissance and preparing the roadway into Zululand.  The force left camp early on 20 January and reached the next camp, at Isandlwana, by noon.

Aftermath 

The British commanders were reasonably pleased with the day's events and considered that the NNC had performed well in their first action. The total Zulu casualties were estimated at thirty killed, including Mkumbikazulu kaSihayo, and four wounded who were captured. At least three unwounded Zulus were taken prisoner by an NNC officer. The able-bodied prisoners were released on 13 January and took refuge at Sotondose's Drift. Chelmsford's orders were to release the wounded prisoners once they had recovered. One of the prisoners received treatment at the British hospital at Rorke's Drift and was killed by the Zulu when they stormed the hospital during the Battle of Rorke's Drift on 22/23 January.  

The British captured 13 horses, 413 cattle, 332 goats and 235 sheep with some of these being driven into Natal. The British soldiers were pleased with this as they anticipated payment of prize money for the livestock.  They were left disappointed when the animals were sold to army contractors at a low price.  A number of obsolete firearms and a brand-new wagon were also recovered from Sihayo's Kraal.

Chelmsford wrote to Frere:

The engagement was reported in the Natal Times of 16 January as a victory over a Zulu attack.  The newspaper mistakenly reported that one NNC officer was killed and two Natal Mounted Police members killed or wounded.  It noted "the prediction of those best acquainted with the Zulus, that they would never stand the fire of regular forces, has been abundantly verified".

Sihayo and his senior son, Mehlokazulu, missed the action, having left the day before with the bulk of his fighting men to answer Cetshwayo's call to arms at Ulundi. He had left just 200-300 men to defend his kraal.  News of the attack reached the Zulu king whilst he was considering which of the three British columns to engage with his main force.  The action seems to have convinced him to attack the Centre Column.  Cetshwayo may have been persuaded that the Centre Column was the most important of the British forces by the presence of Chelmsford directing the attack.  Cetshwayo sent the bulk of his army against it and part of Chelmsford's force was subsequently annihilated at the Battle of Isandlwana on 22 January.  The prisoners released by Chelmsford on 13 January may have helped the inhabitants of Sotondose's Drift attack British survivors of the battle. The survivors of Sihayo's Kraal were certainly present, harassing the fleeing men and killing stragglers. The dead included Lieutenants Teignmouth Melvill and Nevill Coghill who were killed while trying to save the Queen's colour of the 1/24th and the drift afterwards became known as Fugitive's Drift.

Interpretation 

The action at Sihayo's Kraal was the first of the war.  Anglo-Zulu War historian Adrian Greaves, writing in 2012, regards the action at Sihayo's Kraal as a token victory against a small Zulu force consisting of old men and boys.  He considers there was no military value to the engagement as Sihayo's warriors had already left the kraal to assemble with the main army and could not threaten Chelmsford's supply lines.  Greaves thinks the action may have given Chelmsford false confidence that the Zulu would run from future engagements.  Ian Knight considers that Chelmsford took the wrong lesson from the action, rather than noting the determination of the Zulu to hold their ground and the courage of their leaders (Mkumbikazulu having been killed leading his men), he focussed on the ease with which the Zulu had been defeated in a one-sided engagement.  Knight thinks this led to a sense of complacency in the column, which may have had been a factor in their subsequent defeat at Isandlwana.

The location of the action and Sihayo's Kraal is not certain as records kept by the British were vague and no battlefield relics have been recovered. The historian Keith Smith places Sihayo's Kraal at Sokhexe, a settlement still occupied by Sihayo's descendants and the earlier action at a location somewhat to the south near Ngedla hill.  Knight notes that Sihayo's Kraal was known by the name kwaSokhexe or kwaSoxhege ("the maze") and Greaves that it was called kwaSogekle.

Notes

References

Citations

General sources 

1879 in the Zulu Kingdom
Battles involving the United Kingdom
Battles of the Anglo-Zulu War
Conflicts in 1879
History of KwaZulu-Natal
January 1879 events